WTVP (channel 47) is a PBS member television station in Peoria, Illinois, United States, owned by the Illinois Valley Public Telecommunications Corporation. The station's studios are located on State Street in downtown Peoria, and its transmitter is located along Interstate 474 in East Peoria.

Serving as the Peoria area's public television station since 1971, WTVP broadcasts PBS and local programming. Originally housed on studios at the campus of Bradley University but separately owned, WTVP moved to its present facility in 2003. However, borrowing costs from construction and insufficient pledge revenues led to a near-foreclosure and shutdown of the station in January 2008 by its lender. Sufficient support from the community allowed WTVP to settle its debts and remain on the air.

History

Early years
Illinois Valley Public Telecommunications Corporation applied to the Federal Communications Commission (FCC) on March 10, 1970, for permission to build an educational television station on channel 47 in Peoria—even though channel 47 was not the originally designated channel for such a station. It was the second application for the channel that had been filed within two years, as Bradley University (BU) had also filed with the FCC to build such a station in February 1969. The university had been responsible for broadcasting educational television over closed-circuit and microwave systems to participating schools since 1965, and its transmissions reached 30,000 students in 100 schools by 1967. BU, however, opted to form the corporation with five local community groups: Lakeview Museum of Arts and Sciences, Peoria Public Schools, Peoria Public Library, Pekin Public Schools, and Illinois Central College. Phil Weinberg, an academic dean at the university, also arranged for Sesame Street to be aired locally by commercial station WMBD-TV prior to the station's launch.

WTVP began broadcasting on June 27, 1971. For the next 25 years, it was managed by Elwin Basquin, who was named to the station manager post within months of sign-on and rose to general manager and president in the late 1980s; Basquin remained with WTVP until his retirement in 1996. During that time, in 1993, a new transmission facility was built, extending coverage to another 275,000 homes.

A downtown move; near-foreclosure
In 2000, WTVP announced a large fundraising campaign, "Funds for FortySeven", to finance its conversion to digital television and a move off the Bradley campus to a warehouse on State and Water streets in downtown Peoria; the existing quarters at Bradley were cramped for the station, which had to split its staff between two offices. During this time, in January 2002, WTVP became the region's first station to begin digital TV transmissions. The  riverfront facility opened in July 2003 at a cost of $4 million for the building and $5 million more in digital equipment.

However, the financial cost of the move, particularly in borrowing, proved to be a major issue for the station, which had benefited for 32 years from rent-free space on the BU campus. The facility had been paid for by $10.3 million in bonds, and in 2005, WTVP was found to be in technical default after failing to meet covenants related to pledge goals despite continuing to pay down the bonds. Other issues included the bond agreement, signed amid a recession, and an inability to secure federal grant monies to pay for the digital conversion that WTVP had already made out of pocket. In December, Bank of America—the primary lender—issued WTVP a deadline of January 15, 2008, to restructure the agreement with $6.9 still owing on the bonds. For WTVP, this was an existential crisis, as Bank of America indicated that it would foreclose on and put WTVP's assets up for sale; to avoid this fate, WTVP would have to raise about as much money in six weeks as it had in six years. It instead aimed for a $2 million goal, which it believed would be sufficient to permit a restructuring of the bonds.

As 2007 turned to 2008, WTVP had secured $1.4 million. A final offer of $4 million cash, backed by the pledges as well as remaining cash reserves, a loan from National City Bank, and the Illinois Facilities Fund, was made—even though WTVP officials felt the bank had not negotiated in good faith—and rejected. The banks eventually indicated they would agree to be paid a higher amount, requiring further fundraising, and a tentative deal for a $5.25 million payment was made—but WTVP had to raise another $450,000 by February 28 for the deal to hold. The money was raised with a day to spare. Of the money raised from viewers, 70 percent came from first-time donors.

Joint management with WILL
In 2013, WTVP entered into a joint management agreement with Illinois Public Media, the public media service of the University of Illinois Urbana-Champaign. Chet Tomczyk, WTVP's president and CEO, was named interim general manager of Illinois Public Media's WILL stations. Tomczyk retired the next year, and Maurice "Moss" Bresnahan was named president and CEO of both organizations, reporting to the University of Illinois and the Illinois Valley Public Telecommunications Corporation board. The dual leadership arrangement was a prelude to a possible merger, though WTVP ultimately sought to keep its local identity and ended the agreement in 2019 to seek its own executive while continuing programming and other collaborations with WILL. Also in 2014, WTVP began managing master control functions for WQPT, the public television station of Western Illinois University-Quad Cities in Moline. Involvement of WTVP with other public broadcasting in west-central Illinois had first been envisioned in the 1970s when planners linked WTVP to the Convocom educational consortium, whose public television station went on the air as an independent project and is now WSEC in Springfield.

WTVP launched WTVP Remote (47.5), a subchannel with educational content for K-12 students, during the COVID-19 pandemic in May 2020. The next year, it acquired the assets of Peoria Magazine, a monthly publication that was being discontinued by its publisher, and the annual business events it organized.

Local programming
Local programs from WTVP include At Issue, a weekly public affairs series, as well as agriculture program A Shot of Ag with Rob Sharkey and the music performance series State & Water, in addition to documentaries and other special programs.

From 1979 to 1980 and again from 1996 to 2012, WTVP was the broadcaster of Bradley Braves men's basketball. It was the first to telecast Bradley's men's and women's teams.

Subchannels
The station's digital signal is multiplexed:

External links

References

PBS member stations
Television channels and stations established in 1971
TVP
1971 establishments in Illinois